Outgrow.me was an online marketplace for products that was successfully funded through various crowdfunding platforms. The company is based in New York.

In 2013, Time selected it as one of the fifty best websites of 2013.

References

External links
 

Companies based in New York City
Internet properties established in 2012
Crowdfunding
Online marketplaces of the United States